Zulli is an Italian surname. Notable people with the surname include:

Jerry Zulli (born 1978), American baseball coach
Michael Zulli (born 1952), American artist
Zach Zulli (born 1991), American football player

See also
Tulli

Italian-language surnames